The Covenant Presbyterian Church (CPC) is a Protestant, Reformed denomination, founded in United States in 2006 by a group of churches that split from the Reformed Presbyterian Church General Assembly for supporting paedocommunion.

History 
The Presbyterian churches originate from the Protestant Reformation of the 16th century. It is the Christian churches Protestant that adhere to Reformed theology and whose form of ecclesiastical organization is characterized by the government of an assembly of elders. Government Presbyterian is common in Protestant churches that were modeled after the Reformation Protestant Switzerland, notably in Switzerland, Scotland, Netherlands,  France and portions of Prussia, of Ireland and, later, of United States.

In 1983 the Reformed Presbyterian Church, Evangelical Synod (RPCES) merged with Presbyterian Church in America (PCA). Since then, a group of churches in the PCA's Georgia Presbytery has objected to the way the merged denomination made its decisions. Therefore, these churches separated from the PCA and formed the Presbytery of the Covenant.

In 1985 this presbytery grew and split into four presbyteries, thus organizing the assembly of the Reformed Presbyterian Church in the United States. In 1990, the denomination changed its name to the Reformed Presbyterian Church in the Americas.

In 1991 the four presbyteries of this denomination came into conflict. One of these was Hanover Presbytery, which became a separate denomination, the Reformed Presbyterian Church - Hanover Presbytery.

Meanwhile, Westminster Presbytery and Geneva Presbytery formed the Reformed Presbyterian Church General Assembly (RPCGA), leaving the fourth presbytery as a remnant of the Reformed Presbyterian Church in the United States.

In 2006, a group of churches, under the leadership of Pastor James MacDonald, split from RPCGA and formed the Covenant Presbyterian Church (CPCC). Among the main causes for the formality of the denomination is the tolerance of its churches with the practice of necessity, as well as for not in which pastors had a theological training.

The CPC has grown since 2022 and has established itself in a total of 13 churches.

Doctrine 

The CPC, like other Presbyterian denominations, subscribes to the Westminster Confession of Faith, Westminster Larger Catechism and Westminster Shorter Catechism. In addition, it teaches Young Earth Creationism and allows their churches to practice paedocommunion.

The denomination is conservative in its doctrines and practices. Therefore, it opposes same-sex marriage and abortion.

References

Presbyterian denominations in the United States
Christian organizations established in 2006
Presbyterian denominations established in the 21st century